Franklin Ritchie (June 26, 1865 – January 26, 1918) was an American actor of the silent film era. Following his film career with the American Film company, he became an automobile dealer.

Biography
Born as George Frank Ritchie on June 26, 1865 in Ritchie, Clinton County, Pennsylvania, Franklin Edward Ritchie appeared in fifty-one films between 1913 and 1917. 

Ritchie died at the age of fifty-two on Friday, January 25, 1918 when a car he was driving skidded off of a mountain road and fell down an embankment near Los Angeles, California after the edge of the road collapsed. A passenger riding in the car of his friend, William Hamilton, Ritchie was reported to have died instantly while Hamilton was left "injured painfully but not seriously."

Selected filmography

 Man's Enemy (1914)
 Not My Sister (1916)
 The Undertow (1916)
 The Gentle Intruder (1917)

References

External links

1865 births
1918 deaths
Male actors from Pennsylvania
Road incident deaths in California
American male film actors
American male silent film actors
20th-century American male actors